Toda is a Dravidian language noted for its many fricatives and trills. It is spoken by the Toda people, a population of about one thousand who live in the Nilgiri Hills of southern India. The Toda language originated from Toda-Kota subgroup of South Dravidian.

Phonemic inventory

Vowels

For a Dravidian language, Toda's sixteen vowels is an unusually large number. There are eight vowel qualities, each of which may occur long or short.

Consonants

Toda has an unusually large number of fricatives and trills. Its seven places of articulation are the most for any Dravidian language. The voiceless laterals are true fricatives, not voiceless approximants; the retroflex lateral is highly unusual among the world's languages.

Voiceless fricatives are allophonically voiced intervocalically in Toda. There are also the invariably voiced fricatives , though the latter is marginal.

All of these consonants may occur in word-medial and word-final positions. However, only a restricted set occur word-initially.

Unlike the other dental consonants,  is interdental. Similarly,  is labiodental whereas the other labials are bilabial.

Apical consonants are either alveolar or postalveolar. They have the same primary place of articulation. Spajić and colleagues have found that the rhotic that may occur word initially (erroneously called "dental" in previous literature, perhaps because Dravidian coronals tend to be dental by default) has a secondary articulation, which they have tentatively identified as advanced tongue root until further measurements can be made. This analysis is assumed in the transcription .

Another difference between them is that  is the least strongly trilled, most often occurring with a single contact.

The retroflex consonants are subapical. Retroflex  is more strongly trilled than the other rhotics. However, it is not purely retroflex. Although the tongue starts out in a sub-apical retroflex position, trilling involves the tip of the tongue, and this causes it to move forward toward the alveolar ridge. This means that the retroflex trill gives a preceding vowel retroflex coloration the way other retroflex consonants do, but that the vibration itself is not much different from the other trills.

Grammar

Verbal Morphology

As described by Murray B. Emeneau, in his "Toda Grammar and Texts," the entire Toda verbal system is based on the addition of many suffixes to the two base verb stems, stem 1 (henceforth, S1) and stem 2 (henceforth, S2). There are fifteen classes of verbs in Toda, each of which uses one of four suffixes to form its S2 from its S1. A short summary is given below:

1Emeneau lists the rule "S1 -ṟ/-ɬ/-ṛ/-ꞎ/-ḍ/-x + -t- = S2 -ṯ/-ṯ/-ṭ/-ṭ/-ṭ/-k; S1 -r/-l/-n/-s̠/-ḷ/-ṇ + -t- = S1 -d/-ḏ/-ḏ/-ḏ/-ḍ/-ḍ" for this class.

To each of these stems, further suffixes may be added to create verb forms indicating different tenses and moods. The following table summarizes them:

See also
 E. E. Speight, who was compiling Toda grammar in the period before his death

Notes

External links
 The Toda Language, as part of the Endangered Languages project
 Toda at the UCLA Phonetics Archive
 Toda resources
 Toda swadesh list
 Toda morphology

Bibliography
 Emeneau, Murray B. 1984. Toda Grammar and Texts. American Philosophical Society, Memoirs Series, 155. Philadelphia: American Philosophical Society.
 Siniša Spajić, Peter Ladefoged, P. Bhaskararao, 1994. "The rhotics of Toda". In UCLA Working Papers in Phonetics 87: Fieldwork Studies of Targeted Languages II.

Agglutinative languages
Dravidian languages
Languages of Tamil Nadu
Languages of Kerala